The Jackie Gleason Show aired for four seasons on CBS between September 1952 and June 1957.  The program did not air during the 1955-1956 season, being replaced by two half-hour programs: a filmed version of its most popular feature, The Honeymooners, and its former summer replacement series, Stage Show.  In the fall of 1956, The Jackie Gleason Show returned for one more season, again with the Honeymooners sketches as its main feature, before being revived in 1962.

For descriptions of the Honeymooners sketches within The Jackie Gleason Show, see List of The Honeymooners episodes.

Season One: 1952–53

SUMMER REPLACEMENT SERIES: "The Larry Storch Show" took over the timeslot for ten weeks from July 11 to September 12, 1953.

Season Two: 1953–54

SUMMER REPLACEMENT SERIES: Stage Show took over the timeslot for twelve weeks from July 3 to September 18, 1954.

Season Three: 1954–55

SUMMER REPLACEMENT SERIES: America's Greatest Bands took over the timeslot for fourteen weeks from June 25 to September 24, 1955.

Season Four: 1956–57

SUMMER REPLACEMENT SERIES: Filmed repeats of The Jimmy Durante Show (originally aired on NBC) took over the timeslot for the summer, beginning June 29, 1957.

Jackie Gleason Show